"The Baddest" is a song by the American hip-hop artist Froggy Fresh, originally released on April 20, 2012, under the name Krispy Kreme. The song was written by Froggy. The song was accompanied by a music video, just as all subsequent songs by Froggy. The song was Froggy's debut song. The song is also the first track on Froggy's debut album, Money Maker (Re-Loaded).

Release
Froggy Fresh, then under the moniker, Krispy Kreme, recorded and wrote the song in April 2012. It was released under the name Krispy Kreme on April 20, 2012. The song quickly became popular.

Music video
The music video for "The Baddest" was released on April 20, 2012, as Froggy's debut music video and song. The music video went viral, reaching 11 million views, before being removed from YouTube. The original music video, which included the name "Krispy Kreme" in the lyrics, was removed due to a dispute with the Krispy Kreme doughnut company. However, an edited version of the music video, was released by Froggy on February 15, 2013. The music video was featured on several websites, during the time it went viral.

Reception
The viral videos have been highlighted for their slow-witted and braggadocio lyrics, along with being featured on Barstool Sports, and CBS, among others.

Aside from praise of his viral videos, the rapper has also met negativity for "The Baddest" video as Tosh.0 criticized his flow and the beat of the song. The song caused Froggy to also be referred to as "the Rebecca Black of rapping". One instance of his much-criticised lyrics is in the song, "The Baddest", in which he boasted about having 400 cars, scars, guitars, houses (twice), and mouses. "The Baddest" was named the #10 most embarrassing "hip hop moment" by CraveOnline.

References

2012 songs
American hip hop songs
Viral videos
2012 YouTube videos